Heads and Tales or Heads & Tales may refer to:

 Heads and Tales (book), a 1936 book by Malvina Hoffman
 Heads & Tales (album), a 1972 music album by Harry Chapin

See also
Heads and Tails (disambiguation)
Heads or Tails (disambiguation)